The green pufferfish or Ceylon pufferfish (Dichotomyctere fluviatilis, syn. Tetraodon fluviatilis) is a species of pufferfish found in South and Southeast Asia. Its habitat include rivers, estuaries, lakes and flood plains.  It lives in fresh water to slightly brackish water.

Diet
This species is primarily carnivorous, eating mollusks, crustaceans, invertebrates, and some small fish. In captivity, it will eat some vegetation and commercial fish food.  
The green pufferfish has a sharp front beak, allowing it to crush shellfish and crabs

Description
Its body usually has a leathery texture, but green pufferfish grown in captivity tend to have smoother skin. Its flesh contains a virulent toxin, and should not be eaten.

Behavior
This fish is generally peaceful, but becomes more aggressive as it ages. The green pufferfish is able to scare off predators by inflating its body with both water and air, more than doubling in size. Most pufferfish have spines, as well, and these generally help ward off predators.

References 

 http://whozoo.org/Intro2001/munjungs/MJS_GreenPuffer.htm

Tetraodontidae
Fish described in 1822